Kampung Munti is a settlement in the Lundu division of Sarawak, Malaysia.

Neighbouring settlements include:

References

Lundu District
Populated places in Sarawak